Feindouno is a surname. Notable people with the surname include:

 Benjamin Feindouno (born 1983), Guinean footballer
 Pascal Feindouno (born 1981), Guinean footballer
 Simon Feindouno (born 1985), French-Guinean footballer